Leon James "Lee" DeWyze Jr. (born April 2, 1986) is an American singer-songwriter and the winner of the ninth season of American Idol.

Prior to Idol, DeWyze had a solo career and formed the Lee DeWyze Band. He had also released two independent albums called So I'm Told in 2007 and Slumberland in 2010, both on WuLi Records.

DeWyze's first post-Idol album Live It Up was released on November 16, 2010, through RCA Records. WuLi Records, citing demand from DeWyze's fan base, released a third album of pre-Idol recordings, What Once Was, on February 14, 2012. His fifth studio album Frames was released on August 20, 2013, and his sixth album Oil & Water was released on February 12, 2016. His seventh album titled Paranoia was released on February 16, 2018, and his eighth album, Ghost Stories, was released on August 13, 2021.

Background
DeWyze was born in Mount Prospect, Illinois, the eldest son of Kathleen (née Donahue) and Leon (Lee) DeWyze Sr., who worked as a postal carrier in Elk Grove Village, Illinois. He has two older sisters, Shannon and Sarah, and a younger brother, Michael. His musical influences include Cat Stevens, Eric Clapton, Ben Harper, and Simon & Garfunkel.

DeWyze attended St. James Catholic Elementary School in Arlington Heights, Illinois, and Prospect High School in Mount Prospect, Illinois, up until his senior year, when he was expelled because of too many fights. After leaving Prospect High, he attended Forest View Alternative School in Arlington Heights, having been inspired both by his teachers and his interest in music to return to his studies. While he never graduated from either high school, he eventually got his GED.

Career

WuLi Records
After expulsion from high school, DeWyze worked as a paint salesman. He also worked as a trading floor clerk at the Chicago Mercantile Exchange in 2007–2008 before returning to work at the Mount Prospect paint store until he auditioned for American Idol and making it through to the Hollywood rounds of the show. The store continued to support him during his American Idol run by selling tee shirts encouraging fans to vote for Lee.

DeWyze started singing at an early age and was discovered by Louis Svitek, who saw DeWyze, then 17, playing guitar and singing at a house party in the northwest suburbs of Chicago. Svitek signed DeWyze to WuLi Records, the independent record label he runs with Ryan McGuire in Chicago. Dewyze formed the "Lee DeWyze Band" with Svitek, McGuire and Jeff Henderson. DeWyze recorded two albums, So I'm Told (2007) and Slumberland (2010), both produced by Ryan McGuire. WuLi released a remixed and remastered edition of So I'm Told in 2010. In 2008, as a favor to band member Jeff Henderson, DeWyze and the band recorded a disc for Square One Organic Baby Food Company, a company owned by Henderson's wife. DeWyze recorded six songs on the "Square One Organic" promotional CD, also produced by Ryan McGuire.

As a result of touring in the area and performing at many venues, DeWyze and his band's music were known locally, even getting radio play on WXRT long before he auditioned for American Idol. The Lee DeWyze Band was featured on a local television sports program, The Chicago Huddle, hosted by ABC 7's Ryan Chiaverini, during the 2008 and 2009 seasons.

American Idol
DeWyze auditioned in Chicago at the United Center for the ninth season of American Idol on June 22, 2009, after encouragement from his friend Vincent Ferrara who was also trying out for the contest in Chicago. He auditioned with the song "Ain't No Sunshine". He was one of only thirteen people from Chicago, the lowest number out of all seven audition cities, to make it through to Hollywood week. During Hollywood week his group included Aaron Kelly and Crystal Bowersox, all of whom made the Top 5. DeWyze then beat Bowersox and was crowned the winner on May 26, 2010.

His closest friend among the competitors is Andrew Garcia. Garcia was his roommate throughout the season until he was eliminated in the Top 9. Lee stated that he was generally close to all the Top 10 Idols, but he is also especially close to Siobhan Magnus, Katie Stevens, Michael Lynche, Aaron Kelly, and Alex Lambert and Lacey Brown from the Top 16.

DeWyze was one of two contestants in the ninth season to never land in the bottom three, the other being Bowersox. The judges praised him for shedding his shy persona throughout the season and showing, with confidence, that he was "in it to win it."

On May 14, 2010, DeWyze performed at the Arlington Park Race Track in Arlington Heights, Illinois, with more than 41,000 people attending as part of his American Idol Homecoming day. Along with performing at the race track he had a parade in Mount Prospect, performed at a local AT&T store, and threw out the opening pitch at a Chicago Cubs baseball game.

Performances/results

 Song included on American Idol Season 9 compilation album.
 Due to the judges using their one save to save Michael Lynche, the Top 9 remained intact for another week.
 Song selected by Simon Cowell.

RCA Records (2010–2011)
DeWyze's Idol coronation song, a cover of U2's "Beautiful Day", was released as a digital single on May 27, 2010. DeWyze has said about the song: "I like that song a lot; it's a really good song (...) Is it something that is necessarily in my genre? No. There were songs on the table, and I went with the one I thought would represent the moment the best."

DeWyze signed with Simon Fuller's 19 Entertainment and RCA Records.

DeWyze performed the national anthem at the Staples Center for Game 2 of the 2010 NBA Finals on June 6, 2010.

As a result of winning American Idol he became the headliner of the 2010 American Idols LIVE! tour. The songs he chose to perform for the tour include "Beautiful Day", "Rocket Man", "Treat Her Like a Lady", "Hallelujah", and "Use Somebody".

DeWyze won "Choice TV: Male Reality/Variety Star" at the Teen Choice Awards on August 8, 2010.

DeWyze returned to Arlington Park Race Track in Arlington Heights, Illinois, for a post-Idol homecoming concert on September 24, 2010, where he performed for more than 20,000 people. His 12-song set of cover songs and pre-Idol originals also included a new song, "Only Dreaming". On January 23, 2011, DeWyze performed at halftime during the NFC Championship Game between the Chicago Bears and Green Bay Packers at Soldier Field in Chicago.

In July 2010, DeWyze described his upcoming album:

On October 7, 2010, DeWyze announced that his debut album, scheduled for a November 16, 2010, release,
would be called Live It Up and the first single, also called "Live It Up", would debut October 13 on On Air with Ryan Seacrest.

On October 12, 2010, DeWyze announced that his single "Live It Up" would be held off for release. Instead a new single titled "Sweet Serendipity" aired in its place on October 13, 2010.
The album Live It Up was released on November 16, 2010. DeWyze performed the second single, "Beautiful Like You", on the American Idol Season 10 Top 12 Results show on March 17, 2011.

On October 6, 2011, RCA Records CEO Peter Edge confirmed that the 25-year-old DeWyze was no longer on the label. DeWyze was the last of a nine-year partnership between Idol, 19 Recordings and Sony Music, which had an exclusive license on the show's music releases. DeWyze's option officially expired in September.

WuLi Records, citing demand from DeWyze's fan base, has released a third album of pre-Idol recordings, What Once Was, on February 14, 2012. The album has a total of nine tracks.

DeWyze started his "Acoustic Duo Tour" on October 26, 2012.

Vanguard Records and Frames (2013–14)

On January 15, 2013, DeWyze announced that he had signed with Vanguard Records. His first single with the label, "Silver Lining" was originally scheduled to be released to Triple A radio on June 10 and be available digitally the following day. However, the single's release date was pushed up and was released to digital retailers on April 24, 2013.

On May 30, 2013, DeWyze announced the title, track listing and release date of his new album, Frames which was released on August 20, 2013.

On March 9, 2014, a song by DeWyze called "Blackbird Song" was used in the TV series The Walking Dead. According to The Fresno Bee, it was the second most viral song on Spotify in the United States that week. The song debuted on Billboard'''s "Pop Digital Songs" chart at number twenty-nine. The song was used on a sixth-season episode of Suits in 2017.

Oil and Water and Paranoia (2016–present)
DeWyze's sixth studio album, Oil & Water'' was released through Shanachie Entertainment and Pledgemusic on February 12, 2016. It was led by the single "Stone" whose music video premiered April 8, 2016. It was directed by Gabriel Younes, starring actor Harwood Gordon, and filmed near Big Bear Lake.

Philanthropy
DeWyze has been involved with several charity organizations. In July 2012, he teamed with The Heart Foundation's "One for the Heart" Campaign, offering his song "Fight" as a free download to those who donated to the organization. He has twice performed at the Gateway for Cancer Research's annual Cures Gala charity event; once in November 2012 and once in October 2013.

In September 2012, DeWyze performed at Stars on Staff, a charity event held by Music in Schools Today. In November of that year, he performed at the 2013 IP Summit – an event promoting the protection of intellectual property rights, which was held by the Global Intellectual Property Center at the U.S. Chamber of Commerce.
 That December, DeWyze performed at Kringle Mingle, a fundraiser event for the Covenant HealthCare's Covenant Kids Foundation. The following year, in February, he performed at the Chicago Auto Show's First Look for Charity, raising funds for various local charities.

Personal life
DeWyze has some of the lyrics to "Miles From Nowhere", words from a classic Cat Stevens song that say, "Lord, my body has been a good friend but I won't need it when I reach the end" tattooed on his arm. He has three other tattoos, including a silhouette of the Chicago flag and tree of life on his right arm and a Shel Silverstein illustration on his left arm.

On July 27, 2011, DeWyze announced his engagement to model and actress Jonna Walsh. The couple married on July 21, 2012.

Discography

Albums

Digital albums

Singles

Digital singles

Collaborations
2008: Square One Organic Baby Food Company promotional CD (6 of the songs are sung by Lee DeWyze).

Awards and nominations

Footnotes

See also
List of Idols winners

References

External links
Lee DeWyze Official Site
[ Lee DeWyze] at Billboard.com

1986 births
American Idol participants
American Idol winners
American pop guitarists
American pop pianists
American male pop singers
American male singer-songwriters
American rock songwriters
American rock guitarists
American male guitarists
American rock pianists
American male pianists
American rock singers
Living people
Singer-songwriters from Illinois
People from Mount Prospect, Illinois
Vanguard Records artists
19 Recordings artists
21st-century American singers
21st-century American guitarists
21st-century American pianists
Guitarists from Illinois
21st-century American male singers